Kingerlee is a surname. Notable people with the surname include:

John Kingerlee (born 1936), Irish artist
Thomas Henry Kingerlee, builder and twice mayor of Oxford, England